Holy See – Sri Lanka relations are foreign relations between the Holy See and Sri Lanka.  Both countries established diplomatic relations in 1976. The Holy See has a nunciature in Colombo. As of December 2011, Ms. Tamara Kunanayakam, who is Sri Lanka's Permanent Representative to the United Nations in Geneva, was the concurrently accredited ambassador of Sri Lanka to the Holy See. She presented her Credentials on 15 December 2011 to Pope Benedict XVI. The Apostolic Nunciature of Sri Lanka has been vacant since October 2013.

Papal visits
Three popes have visited Sri Lanka: Pope Paul VI in December 1970, Pope John Paul II in January 1995 and Pope Francis in January 2015. Pope Benedict XVI met Sri Lankan president Mahinda Rajapaksa in the Vatican in June 2012.

Pope Francis visited Sri Lanka on 13 January 2015; during his visit Pope Francis met President of Sri Lanka Maithripala Sirisena. Pope Francis is the first pope to have visited the Shrine of Our Lady of Madhu.

See also
 Foreign relations of the Holy See
 Foreign relations of Sri Lanka

References

External links
Sri Lanka (nunciature)
Pope makes appeal for Sri Lanka aid

 
Sri Lanka
Bilateral relations of Sri Lanka